El Economista (Spanish: The Economist) is a Spanish daily newspaper which focuses on economical, financial and business affairs. The daily is headquartered in Madrid, Spain.

History and profile
El Economista was first published on 28 February 2006, being the fourth financial daily in Spain. The founders of the daily are Alfonso de Salas, Juan Gonzales and Gregorio Pena who also launched El Mundo daily. The Editorial Ecoprensa, S.A. is the publisher the daily of which CEO is Salas.

The paper's target audience include professional and modern readers and investors. It advocates the free competition, female equality and transparency. The daily is published in broadsheet format and uses plain and easy-to-understand words while reporting complex economical and financial affairs in its four sections which have their own colors. It does not employ standard pink paper generally used in financial dailies, instead it uses white paper and full color print. The number of pages on weekdays is 36 whereas it is 64 during weekends. Each Saturday the daily gives a supplement, El Especial, which provides analyses, reports and investigative articles. In weekdays it also offers two distinct supplements. On 31 March 2006 its website was launched and the paper became the first Spanish financial daily to publish on Internet. The daily later started an English website.

El Economista was awarded the World’s Best Designed Newspaper™ for 2006 by the Society for News Design (SND). In 2006 and in 2007, El Economista was named again by the SND as the best designed newspaper in Spain and Portugal. For the period of 2006-2007, the World Association of Newspapers named the paper as one of the world’s ten best designed newspapers.

Circulation
The 2007 OJD certified circulation of El Economista was 26,155 copies. In 2011, El Economista was the third daily in its category with a circulation of 23,000 copies. Its circulation rose to 32,274 copies in 2012.

See also
List of newspapers in Spain

References

External links

2006 establishments in Spain
Business in Spain
Business newspapers
Daily newspapers published in Spain
Newspapers published in Madrid
Publications established in 2006
Spanish-language newspapers
Spanish-language websites